The former Third Church of Christ, Scientist built in 1906 is an historic Christian Science church building located at 3648 West 25th Street (now 3648 Pearl Road) in Cleveland, Ohio, It was designed in the Classical Revival style by noted Cleveland architect Frederick N. Striebinger.

On March 19, 1987, it was added to the National Register of Historic Places. As of that date the building was vacated, but managed by Kotecki Monuments. The building housed Bethlehem Temple of Praise Church.  It is now listed as Iglesia de Restauracion Elim with Pastor Felipe Ruiz as of July 2018.

The Third Church of Christ, Scientist is no longer listed in the Christian Science Journal.

See also
 List of former Christian Science churches, societies and buildings
 List of Registered Historic Places in Cleveland, Ohio

References

Churches in Cleveland
Christian Science churches in Ohio
Churches on the National Register of Historic Places in Ohio
Former Christian Science churches, societies and buildings in Ohio
Churches completed in 1906
20th-century Christian Science church buildings
National Register of Historic Places in Cleveland, Ohio
1906 establishments in Ohio